Maylandia heteropicta is a species of cichlid endemic to Lake Malawi where it is only known from Thumbi West Island.  This species can reach a length of  SL.  It can also be found in the aquarium trade.

References

heteropicta
heteropicta
Taxa named by Wolfgang Staeck
Fish described in 1980
Taxonomy articles created by Polbot
Taxobox binomials not recognized by IUCN